Naïs Djouahra (born 23 November 1999) is a French professional footballer who plays as a left winger for Croatian club Rijeka.

Club career
Born in Bourgoin-Jallieu, Auvergne-Rhône-Alpes, Djouahra began his career with US Ruy Montceau at the age of six. He subsequently represented FC Bourgoin Jallieu before joining AS Saint-Étienne's youth setup for the under-14s.

On 3 July 2018, after opting not to renew his contract with Saint-Étienne, Djouahra signed a two-year contract with Real Sociedad, being initially assigned to the reserves in Segunda División B. He made his senior debut on 1 September, starting and scoring his team's second in a 3–0 home win against SCD Durango.

On 26 February 2019, after establishing himself as a regular for Sanse, Djouahra renewed his contract until 2021. He made his first team – and La Liga – debut on 29 June of the following year, coming on as a late substitute for Aritz Elustondo in a 2–1 away loss against Getafe CF.

On 30 September 2020, Djouahra was loaned to Segunda División side CD Mirandés for the season. He scored his first professional goal on 13 February of the following year, netting the opener in a 3–3 home draw against Girona FC.

Personal life
Born in France, Djouahra is of Algerian descent.

References

External links
 
 
 

1999 births
Living people
People from Bourgoin-Jallieu
Sportspeople from Isère
French footballers
French sportspeople of Algerian descent
Association football wingers
La Liga players
Segunda División players
Segunda División B players
Croatian Football League players
AS Saint-Étienne players
Real Sociedad B footballers
Real Sociedad footballers
CD Mirandés footballers
HNK Rijeka players
French expatriate footballers
French expatriate sportspeople in Spain
French expatriate sportspeople in Croatia
Expatriate footballers in Spain
Footballers from Auvergne-Rhône-Alpes